The Russian Census of 2021 was the first census of the Russian Federation population since 2010 and the third after the dissolution of the Soviet Union. It took place between October 15 and November 14. However, for the remote and inaccessible areas of Russia, the census took place between April 1 and December 20.

The preparations for the census started in 2017 with the adoption of the government decree "On the conduct of the Russian Population Census 2020". According to Pavel Malkov, head of Rosstat, the budget allocated for the 2020 census was 33 billion rubles. The motto of the census was "Create the future!".

On June 25, 2020, Rosstat announced its intention to conduct the main stage of the Russian population census in April 2021, and on June 29 this was confirmed. Due to the spread of COVID-19, the census dates were shifted several times, first to April, then to October 2021. The results have come under scrutiny due to a lack of participation within the census. Rosstat maintains that 99% of the population completed the census however the Levada Center estimated that around 42% of the population was not enumerated and has described the results as "one of the worst in 150 years".

Pilot census 2018 
The pilot census was conducted from October 1 to October 31, 2018. The main purpose was the development and testing of software and methodological, organizational and technological issues of the 2020 Census, taking into account the use of new methods of collecting information. The pilot census was divided into three stages: October 1–10 — online census; October 16–27 — door-to-door rounds; October 27–31 — control walk.

10 territories were allocated for the pilot census, the total population of which was about 550,000 people. These territories include:
 Elbrussky District, Kabardino-Balkaria
 Khangalassky District, Sakha
 Aleutsky District, Kamchatka Krai
 Minusinsk, Krasnoyarsk Krai
 Nizhneudinsky and Katangsky Districts,  Irkutsk Oblast
 Veliky Novgorod
 Yuzhno-Kurilsky District, Sakhalin Oblast
 Sviblovo District, Moscow
 Knyazhevo municipality, St. Petersburg
In addition to the census through the State Services portal, for the first time in Russian history, the national postal operator Russian Post was involved in the census. According to the results of the 2018 pilot census, nearly 460,000 households were enumerated in electronic form with more than 1.2 million inhabitants.

Updating the information
In August 2019, in preparation for the 2020 census, work began to update the address lists in cities and rural areas. Based on the work of the registrars, the exact number of houses in each city and their location were determined. Later, Rosstat specialists conducted zoning to form enumeration and census areas. So, thanks to the registrars, a previously not documented village of Yozhikovo was "discovered" in Ruzsky District and two new ones in Udmurtia: Rodniki and Kurtekovo; in Kaluga Oblast more than 35,000 new addresses were recorded.

Questions 
The census forms of standard "L", "P" and "V" were approved by the Government. The same questions are printed in paper questionnaires and are used in electronic tablets.

L-form — designed to be filled in for persons permanently residing in Russia
P-form — filled in for the premises and characterizes the living conditions of the people
V-form — filled in for persons temporarily staying in the territory of Russia at the time of the census, but permanently residing abroad.

Format 
All inhabited areas were visited by census takers from October 15 to November 14, 2021. They had electronic tablets where the respondents' answers were entered. Residents of Russia also were able to come to the census stations and answer the questions there; the stations also worked from October 15 to November 14. For the first time, there was an opportunity to fill the census form on the portal of public services (Gosuslugi) until November 8. The term for summing up the preliminary results is April 2022. The final results of the census are projected to be published in the 4th quarter of 2022.

Provisional results 
Provisional results of the census have been published by Rosstat with further results announced for publication in June–December 2022.

** — including the results of the federal statistical study "Population census in the Crimean Federal District" with 100% population coverage.

Scheduled release dates for final census results 
On May 30, 2022, Rosstat published the following schedule for the publication of the final results of the population census: The current released figures can be found on the Rosstat website.
 June 2022: population by country and by all municipalities in each region
 August 2022: beginning of publication of data in the form of tables and graphs on the Rosstat website
 September 2022: gender, age, education, ethnicity and language proficiency
 October 2022: population migration, information about indigenous peoples
 November 2022: birth rate, household composition.
 December 2022: housing conditions, labor force characteristics.

Final results 
The publication of the final results of the census is made on the website of Rosstat:
 September 1, 2022, volume 1 of the census results “Population size and distribution” was published on the Rosstat website;
 October 1, 2022 - Volume 2 Sex and Marriage, Volume 3 Education, Volume 4 Citizenship, Volume 8 Number and Composition of Households, and Volume 10 Labor Force;
 November 1, 2022, volume 6 of the census results “Population Migration” was published on the Rosstat website;
 December 1, 2022 - Volume 7 - Livelihoods, Volume 9 - Fertility;
 December 30, 2022 - Volume 5 - "National (ethnic group) Composition and Language Proficiency", Volume 11 - "Housing Conditions of the Population".

Volume 1 "Number and distribution of the population" 
 Table 1. Population counted in the 2020 Russian Population Census 
 Table 2. Population change in Russia 
 Table 3. Number of municipalities, intracity districts, city districts, inter-settlement territories and settlements by constituent entities of the Russian Federation
 Table 4. The number of urban and rural population by sex in the constituent entities of the Russian Federation
 Table 5. Population of Russia, federal districts, constituent entities of the Russian Federation, urban districts, municipal districts, municipal districts, urban and rural settlements, urban settlements, rural settlements with a population of 3,000 people or more
 Table 6. Grouping of urban districts by population by constituent entities of the Russian Federation
 Table 7. Grouping of municipal districts and municipal districts by population in the constituent entities of the Russian Federation
 Table 8. Grouping of urban settlements of municipal districts by population in the constituent entities of the Russian Federation
 Table 9. Grouping of rural settlements of municipal districts by population in the constituent entities of the Russian Federation
 Table 10. Grouping of urban settlements by population by constituent entities of the Russian Federation
 Table 11. Grouping of rural settlements by population in the constituent entities of the Russian Federation.

Volume 2 "Age-sex composition and marital status" 
 Table 1. Population by age and sex
 Table 2. Population by age groups and gender by constituent entities of the Russian Federation
 Table 3. Population by main age groups by constituent entities of the Russian Federation
 Table 4. Demographic burden on the working-age population by constituent entities of the Russian Federation
 Table 5. Population by age, sex and marital status by constituent entities of the Russian Federation.

Volume 3 "Education" 
 Table 1. Population by age, gender and level of education by constituent entities of the Russian Federation
 Table 2 Degree-holding population by age group and sex
 Table 3. Population with academic degrees, by age group and gender, by constituent entity of the Russian Federation
 Table 4. Employed population of private households by age groups, gender and level of education in the constituent entities of the Russian Federation
 Table 5. Population enrolled in basic and additional educational programs, gender and age by constituent entities of the Russian Federation.

Volume 4 "Citizenship" 
 Table 1. Population by citizenship and age groups
 Table 2. Population by citizenship and age groups by subjects of the Russian Federation
 Table 3. Population by citizenship and place of birth
 Table 4. Population by citizenship and place of birth by subjects of the Russian Federation

Volume 5 "National (ethnic group) composition and language proficiency" 
 Table 1. National (ethnic) composition of the population
 Table 2. Composition of the population group “Those who indicated other answers about national (ethnic) affiliation”
 Table 3. Population by nationality (ethnic groups), knowledge of the Russian language and its use
 Table 4. Language proficiency and use of languages by the population
 Table 5. Language skills of the population of the most numerous nationalities (ethnic groups)
 Table 6. Population by mother tongue
 Table 7. Population of the most numerous nationalities (ethnic groups) by native language
 Table 8. Population of the most numerous nationalities (ethnic groups) by age group and sex
 Table 9. Population of the most numerous nationalities (ethnic groups) by age group, sex and marital status
 Table 10. Population of the most numerous nationalities (ethnic groups) by age group, sex and level of education
 Table 11. Population of the most numerous nationalities (ethnic groups) by age groups, sex and sources of livelihood
 Table 12. Language proficiency of the population of different age groups
 Table 13. Private households of two or more persons by national homogeneity and household size
 Table 14. Women of the most numerous nationalities by nationality, age group and number of children born
 Table 15. Women of the most numerous nationalities by nationality, level of education and number of children born
 Table 16. Women of the most numerous nationalities by age at which they gave birth to their first child
 Table 17. Population of indigenous peoples of the Russian Federation
 Table 18. Knowledge of the languages of the indigenous peoples of the Russian Federation
 Table 19. Use of languages by the indigenous peoples of the Russian Federation
 Table 20. Population of indigenous peoples of the Russian Federation by mother tongue

Volume 6 "Population Migration" 
 Table 1. Population by place of birth and place of residence on the territory of the Russian Federation by constituent entities of the Russian Federation
 Table 2. Population of private households by duration of residence in the place of permanent residence, sex, age groups by constituent entities of the Russian Federation
 Table 3. Population of private households by place of permanent residence and residence for more than one year in other countries by constituent entities of the Russian Federation
 Table 4. Population of private households by residence for more than one year in other countries and year of arrival in the territory of the Russian Federation
 Table 5. Population of private households by place of residence, age groups and place of registration by constituent entities of the Russian Federation
 Table 6. Employed population of private households aged 15 years and over by place of residence and place of registration in the constituent entities of the Russian Federation
 Table 7. Population temporarily staying on the territory of the Russian Federation, by country of permanent residence and purpose of coming to Russia
 Table 8. Population temporarily staying on the territory of the Russian Federation, by country of permanent residence and purpose of coming to Russia by constituent entities of the Russian Federation
 Table 9. Population temporarily staying on the territory of the Russian Federation, by country of permanent residence and age groups
 Table 10. Population temporarily staying on the territory of the Russian Federation, by country of permanent residence and age groups by constituent entities of the Russian Federation
 Table 11. Population temporarily staying on the territory of the Russian Federation for the purpose of work, study or private travel, by country of permanent residence and citizenship

Volume 7 "Sources of Livelihood" 
 Table 1. Population by age groups, sex and sources of livelihood
 Table 2. Population by age groups, gender and sources of livelihood by constituent entities of the Russian Federation
 Table 3. Population by Main Source of Livelihood, Age Group and Sex
 Table 4. Population by Main Source of Livelihood, Age Groups and Gender by Constituent Entities of the Russian Federation

Volume 8 "Number and composition of households" 
 Table 1. Population of private and collective households, homeless households by constituent entities of the Russian Federation.
 Table 2. Private households by household size by constituent entities of the Russian Federation.
 Table 3. Private households of two or more persons by type, household size and number of children under 18.
 Table 4. Private households consisting of two or more people, by types, household size and number of children under 18 years of age in the constituent entities of the Russian Federation.
 Table 5. Private households of two or more persons, by number of employees aged 15 years and over and number of dependents.
 Table 6. Private households consisting of two or more people, by the number of employees aged 15 years and over and the number of dependents by constituent entities of the Russian Federation.
 Table 7. Population of private one-person households by main source of livelihood and age groups.
 Table 8. Population of private households consisting of one person, by main source of livelihood and age groups by constituent entities of the Russian Federation.
 Table 9. Family units in private households by size and number of children under 18.
 Table 10. Family cells that are part of private households, by size and number of children under 18 years of age in the constituent entities of the Russian Federation.
 Table 11. Family cells in private households with adults under 35 by size and number of children under 18.
 Table 12. Family cells that are part of private households with adults under 35 years of age, by size and number of children under 18 years of age, by constituent entity of the Russian Federation.
 Table 13. Family cells that are part of private households, by age groups of children.
 Table 14. Population of collective and homeless households by sex and age groups.

Volume 9 Fertility 
 Table 1. Women living in private households, by age groups and number of children born in the constituent entities of the Russian Federation.
 Table 2. Employed women living in private households, by age groups and the number of children born in the constituent entities of the Russian Federation.
 Table 3. Married women living in private households, by age groups and number of children born in the constituent entities of the Russian Federation.
 Table 4. Women living in private households, by age groups and age at which they gave birth to their first child, by constituent entities of the Russian Federation.
 Table 5. Average number of children born to women living in private households with different levels of education, by constituent entities of the Russian Federation (per 1,000 women of the corresponding age and level of education who indicated the number of children born).

Volume 10 "Workforce" 
 Table 1. Population of private households by age group, sex and labor force participation status.
 Table 2. Population of private households by age groups, gender and labor force participation status by constituent entities of the Russian Federation.
 Table 3. Population of Private Households by Gender, Labor Force Status and Level of Education.
 Table 4. Population of Private Households by Labor Force Participation Status and Level of Education by Constituent Entities of the Russian Federation.
 Table 5. Potential labor force for reasons of non-participation in the labor force.
 Table 6. Potential labor force for reasons of non-participation in the labor force by constituent entities of the Russian Federation.
 Table 7. Employed population of private households by sex, age groups and employment status.
 Table 8. Employed population of private households by age groups and employment status by constituent entities of the Russian Federation.
 Table 9. Employed population of private households by territory of location of work and employment status.
 Table 10. Employed population of private households by territory of location of work and employment status by constituent entities of the Russian Federation.
 Table 11. Employed population of private households working outside their settlement, by territory of location of work and frequency of travel to work.
 Table 12. Employed population of private households working outside their settlement, by territory of location of work and frequency of travel to work by constituent entities of the Russian Federation.

Volume 11 "Housing conditions of the population" 
 Table 1. Population by types of residential premises occupied by constituent entities of the Russian Federation
 Table 2. Private households by types of residential premises occupied and household size by constituent entities of the Russian Federation
 Table 3. Private households living in individual houses, separate and communal apartments, by number of rooms occupied and household size
 Table 4. Population of private households living in individual houses, separate and communal apartments, by the time the house was built and the material of the outer walls
 Table 5. Provision of private households living in individual houses, separate and communal apartments, with various types of improvement
 Table 6. Dwellings by type, number of rooms and number of private households living in them
 Table 7. Private households by types of residential premises occupied and the size of the total area of ​​an individual house, apartment

See also 
 Demographics of Russia

References 

Censuses in Russia
2021 in Russia
2021 censuses